David Affengruber (born 19 March 2001) is an Austrian professional footballer who plays as a central defender for Sturm Graz.

Club career
On 11 June 2021, he signed a three-year contract with Sturm Graz.

Honours
Red Bull Salzburg Youth
Jugendliga U18: 2019

FC Liefering

Runner-up
 Austrian Football First League: 2021
Red Bull Salzburg 
Austrian Champion: 2021
Austrian Cup: 2021

References

External links 

2001 births 
Living people
Austrian footballers
Austria youth international footballers
Austria under-21 international footballers
Association football forwards
FC Liefering players
FC Red Bull Salzburg players
SK Sturm Graz players
2. Liga (Austria) players
Austrian Football Bundesliga players